Lake High School is a public high school near Millbury, Ohio in Lake Township.  It is the only high school in the Lake Local School District, serving about 500 students in grades 8 to 12.

Athletics 
Lake's athletic teams are known as the Flyers, named for the Metcalf Field Airport (now the Toledo Executive Airport) directly across the street from campus.  Since 2011, they have been members of the Northern Buckeye Conference after being in the Suburban Lakes League from 1996 to 2011 and the Northern Lakes League from 1960 to 1996. The school colors are Navy Blue, White, and Columbia Blue.

Baseball 
Recent program success includes SLL championships in 2001, 2002, and 2003, including a regional championship in 2001 and a regional runner-up in 2003. Lake also won the SLL championship in 2011 as well as winning the NBC championship in 2012, 2014, and 2016, including Sectional and District Championships as well.

Girls basketball 
The Lake Flyers girls basketball team won the first-ever Northern Buckeye Conference championship in 2012 after winning three-straight Suburban Lakes League Championships in 2009, 2010, and 2011, including Sectional and District championships as well.

Boys basketball 
The Lake Flyers boys basketball team won Northern Buckeye Conference championships in 2012, 2014, and 2015.

Football 
The Lake Flyers football team won the first-ever Northern Buckeye Conference championship in 2015, which was their first league title since they won the SLL in 2001.

Boys golf 
The Lake Flyers boys golf team won the Northern Buckeye Conference Championship  title in 2013 and 2021.

Girls soccer 
The Lake Flyers girls soccer team won NBC championships in 2011, 2012, 2014, and 2017.

Boys soccer 
The Lake Flyers boys soccer team won the Northern Buckeye Conference championship in 2016. This was their first league title for the sport.

2010 tornado
On Saturday, June 5, 2010, a large portion of Lake High School was destroyed by an EF4 tornado, which killed seven in the area around Millbury.  The tornado threw a bus onto the tennis courts and tore off the back end of the school and also hit the Lake Township police station.  Graduation was to be held on Sunday, June 6 at the school. The building was described as "completely destroyed" and "unsalvageable". One of those killed was the father of the 2010 valedictorian.  The students spent two school years at Owens Community College while the new building was constructed.

Notable alumni 
 Dominick Evans – filmmaker and activist, class of 1999

References

External links
 District Website
 Lake High School. National Center for Education Statistics.

High schools in Wood County, Ohio
Public high schools in Ohio